Gurnetia durranti is an extinct moth in the family Cossidae, and the only species in the genus Gurnetia. It was described from a specimen found in the Bouldnor Formation on the Isle of Wight. It is dated to the Late Eocene.

References

Natural History Museum Lepidoptera generic names catalog

Fossil Lepidoptera
†
Eocene insects
Fossils of Great Britain